Ewald Wiśniowski (24 November 1927 – 23 June 1970) was a Polish footballer. He played in one match for the Poland national football team in 1953.

References

External links
 

1927 births
1970 deaths
Polish footballers
Poland international footballers
Place of birth missing
Association footballers not categorized by position